Kevin Miller may refer to:

 Kevin Miller (cricketer) (born 1936), Australian cricketer
 Kevin Miller (American football) (born 1955), American football wide receiver
 Kevin Miller (ice hockey) (born 1965), retired American ice hockey player
 Kevin Miller (footballer) (born 1969), English goalkeeper
 Kevin Miller (radio host) (born 1968), American talk radio show host
 Kevin Miller (voice actor) (born 1977), American voice actor
 Kevin D. Miller, member of the Ohio House of Representatives
 Kevin Miller, former drummer of the alternative rock band Fuel

See also
Kevan Miller (born 1987), ice hockey player
Kevin Millar (born 1971), baseball player